The 2003 ASEAN Club Championship or the 2003 ACC was the first edition of the ASEAN Club Championship, an international association football competition between domestic champion clubs sides affiliated with the member associations of the ASEAN Football Federation. It was held at Indonesia. Invitee's East Bengal from India were crowned the inaugural champions. It was only time that a non ASEAN side had won the title. Originally, the championship was to be hosted by Vietnam.

Qualified teams

Group stage
Matchday dates are: 13–26 July 2003
Group winners and runners-up qualify for quarter-finals

Group A

(Finance and Revenue withdrew from the competition without playing a single match).

Group B

Group C

Group D

Knockout stage
 Bracket

Quarter-finals

Semifinals

3rd place playoff

Final

Top scorers

References

Club
2003 in Indonesian sport
International association football competitions hosted by Indonesia
ASEAN Club Championship